Republica is an English alternative rock band formed in 1994.

Republica may also refer to:

 re:publica, a yearly conference in Berlin
 República (district of São Paulo), Brazil
 Republica, Australian literary journal published 1994–5, see List of literary magazines
 Republica (newspaper), Nepalese newspaper
 Republica A/S, a Danish advertising company
 República, LLC, an advertising company headquartered in Miami, Florida
 República metro station (Santiago), in Santiago, Chile
 Republica metro station, in Bucharest, Romania

See also
 La República (disambiguation)
 La Repubblica, an Italian newspaper
 Republic (disambiguation)
Republika (disambiguation)